Peter Seilern (born 7 February 1936) is a British alpine skier. He competed in the men's slalom at the 1956 Winter Olympics.

References

1936 births
Living people
British male alpine skiers
Olympic alpine skiers of Great Britain
Alpine skiers at the 1956 Winter Olympics
Sportspeople from Vienna